Dammon Round Barn is a round barn just southeast of Red Wing, Minnesota, United States, adjacent to U.S. Route 61. The barn is listed on the National Register of Historic Places. It was built during a time of agricultural growth in Goodhue County, when dairy cow herds were averaging 25 cows per farm and farmers were starting to build specialized barns. The round barn design was built around a silo and provided insulation for the silage, as well as making feeding and cleaning easier. Despite their efficiency round barns were difficult to construct, and they were not widely adopted. Later in its history the barn was used for honey production of the beekeeping owners of the farm. In 2000 the farm was purchased by Robin and Elaine Kleffman and the Dammon Barn underwent some significant restoration. A straightening of the walls and replacement of the original pillars for the upper floor support and a leveling and new installation of a floor in the top level of the barn makes this one of the most premiere remaining round barns in Minnesota.

The barn is now part of a bed and breakfast and event center.  The  facility is available as a venue for weddings.

See also
 List of round barns
 National Register of Historic Places listings in Goodhue County, Minnesota

References

External links
 Round Barn Farm B&B Event Center

Barns on the National Register of Historic Places in Minnesota
Bed and breakfasts in Minnesota
Buildings and structures in Goodhue County, Minnesota
National Register of Historic Places in Goodhue County, Minnesota
Round barns in Minnesota